John Aldis was a representative to the Great and General Court of colonial Massachusetts in 1683 and served for 12 years on the Board of Selectmen in Dedham, Massachusetts.

He was the only son of Nathan Aldis and his wife Mary. Aldis had a son also named John.

Aldis was admitted as a townsman on January 1, 1650 – 1651. He served as a constable in 1660 and in 1663 was returned to the Jury of Trials of Suffolk County. In 1681, the town voted to collect all deeds and other writings and store them in a box kept by Aldis in order to better preserve them. He was a deacon at the First Church and Parish in Dedham and an ancestor of Asa O. Aldis.

Notes

References

Works cited

Dedham, Massachusetts selectmen
Members of the colonial Massachusetts General Court from Dedham
Deacons at First Church and Parish in Dedham
Signers of the Dedham Covenant